Lindsay Davenport and Lisa Raymond were the defending champions, but Raymond did not compete this year. Davenport teamed up with Corina Morariu and were eliminated in first round.

Nadia Petrova and Meghann Shaughnessy won the title by defeating Myriam Casanova and Alicia Molik 3–6, 6–2, 7–5 in the final. It was the 6th title for both players in their respective doubles careers. It was also the 2nd title for the pair during the season, after their win in Miami.

Seeds

Draw

Draw

External links
 ITF tournament edition details

Bausch and Lomb Championships - Doubles
Doubles